Jonathon Andrew Benn (born 24 June 1967) is a former English cricketer.  Benn was a right-handed batsman who bowls right-arm medium pace.  He was born in Rawtenstall, Lancashire.

Benn made his debut for Northumberland in the 1989 MCCA Knockout Trophy against Lincolnshire.  Benn played Minor counties cricket for Northumberland from 1989 to 2002, which included 43 Minor Counties Championship matches and 7 MCCA Knockout Trophy matches.  He made his only List A appearance against Yorkshire in the 1992 NatWest Trophy.  He opened the batting in this match, scoring a single run before being dismissed by Darren Gough.

References

External links
Jonathon Benn at ESPNcricinfo
Jonathon Benn at CricketArchive

1967 births
Living people
People from Rawtenstall
English cricketers
Northumberland cricketers